Captain Cornelius Mitchell (died 1749) was a Royal Navy officer who served as Commander-in-Chief of the Jamaica Station.

Naval career
Mitchell was promoted to post captain on 14 June 1731 on appointment to the command of the fourth-rate HMS Larke. He transferred to the command of the fourth-rate HMS Rochester in August 1739, of the third-rate HMS Buckingham in October 1740, of the third-rate HMS Kent in 1741 and of the fourth-rate HMS Adventure in 1744. He was accused of failing to pursue a French squadron when in charge of a superior force in August 1746 and, although he served briefly as Commander-in-Chief of the Jamaica Station in 1746, he was tried by court-martial and sentenced to be cashiered and "rendered incapable of ever being employed in his Majesty's service" in January 1748.

References

Sources

Royal Navy officers
1749 deaths
Royal Navy officers who were court-martialled